Luscombe may refer to:

Surname
Notable people with the surname Luscombe include:
Belinda Luscombe, Australian-born journalist
Donald Arthur Luscombe (1895–1965), American businessman and entrepreneur
Francis Luscombe (1849-1926), English rugby union international
Hal Luscombe (born 1981), Wales international rugby union player
John Luscombe (1848-1937), English rugby union international
Lee Luscombe (born 1971), English professional soccer player
Matthew Luscombe (1776–1846), English missionary bishop of the Anglican Communion
Michael Luscombe,  Australian businessman - former CEO and Managing Director of Woolworths Limited
Nathan Luscombe (born 1989), English footballer
Nick Luscombe, British radio DJ  
Stephen Luscombe (born 1954), English musician 
Ted Luscombe (born 1924), Anglican bishop and author, Primus of the Scottish Episcopal Church
Tim Luscombe (born 1960), British playwright, director, actor and teacher

Places
Luscombe Castle, near Dawlish, Devon, England
Luscombe, Rattery, an historic estate in Devon

See also
Luscombe Searelle (1853–1907), English musical composer and impresario
Luscombe Aircraft,  defunct American aircraft manufacturer
Luscombe Airfield,  airfield at Nui Dat, Phuoc Tuy Province, South Vietnam (now in Ba Ria-Vung Tau Province, Vietnam)